The Gold Line is a rapid transit line of the Doha Metro. The east-west Gold Line runs through Doha, extending from Ras Abu Aboud Station to Al Aziziya Station over a distance of 32 km. Is a part of the Qatar Integrated Rail Project, which is guided by the Qatar National Vision 2030. It was officially opened on 21 November, 2019.

Stations

Construction
Gold Line metro project was awarded to a global consortium (Joint Venture Company) consisting of five companies. Aktor S.A from Greece, Larsen & Toubro LTD from India, Yapi Merkezi from Turkey, STFA also from Turkey and Al Jaber Engineering from Qatar.

External links
Qatar Rail – official website

References

Doha Metro
Rapid transit in Qatar
2019 establishments in Qatar
Railway lines opened in 2019